Karim Laribi (born 20 April 1991) is a professional footballer who plays as a left winger for  club Pro Vercelli and the Tunisia national team. Born in Italy to a Tunisian father and an Italian mother, Laribi has represented Tunisia at senior level since 2017.

Club career

Early career
A youth product of Inter, Laribi left Italy in 2007 to accept a lucrative offer from Fulham, where he spent two season as part of the club's own academy in England. He returned to Italy in 2009 as free agent to become part of the Palermo squad that won the Campionato Nazionale Primavera in 2010.

In July 2010, he was sent on loan to Lega Pro Prima Divisione club Foggia in order to get some first team experience; he played a total 28 games under the tenure of famous football master Zdeněk Zeman, scoring four goals in the season.

Sassuolo
In July 2011, Palermo accepted a loan offer for Laribi from ambitious Serie B club Sassuolo, with an option for his new club to turn the move into a co-ownership by the end of the season. On 19 June 2012, Sassuolo acquired the half of the registration rights for €100,000 fee. In June 2013, Sassuolo him outright for free.

He was loaned out to Serie B side Latina on 8 January 2014.

On 22 July 2014, Laribi joined Bologna on loan. In mid-2014, Laribi signed a new 3-year contract with Sassuolo.

Cesena
On 27 August 2016, Laribi left for Cesena on loan.

On 4 August 2017, Laribi was signed by Cesena outright.

Hellas Verona
On 31 July 2018, Laribi signed with Hellas Verona A contract until 2021.

On 8 July 2019, Laribi joined to Empoli F.C. on loan with an option to buy.

On 21 January 2020, Laribi joined Serie C club Bari on loan until 30 June 2020.

On 26 January 2021 he moved on loan to Serie B club Reggiana.

Reggina
On 16 July 2021 he signed a two-year contract with Serie B club Reggina. On 31 January 2022, Laribi joined Cittadella on loan. On 1 September 2022, Laribi's contract with Reggina was terminated by mutual consent.

Pro Vercelli
On 28 January 2023, Laribi moved to Pro Vercelli in Serie C.

International career
Laribi was born in Italy to a Tunisian father and an Italian mother. Laribi was part of the Italian youth national teams, and made his debut with the under-20 team in 2011. On 15 August 2012, he made his debut with the Italy U-21 team, in a friendly match against Netherlands.

Laribi was later called up to the Tunisia national football team, and made his debut in a 1–0 loss to Cameroon on 24 March 2017. In May 2018 he was named in Tunisia's preliminary 29 man squad for the 2018 FIFA World Cup in Russia.

Career statistics

Club

References

External links
 
 
 

1991 births
Living people
Tunisian footballers
Tunisia international footballers
Italian footballers
Italy youth international footballers
Italy under-21 international footballers
Italian people of Tunisian descent
Italian sportspeople of African descent
Association football midfielders
Footballers from Milan
Serie A players
Serie B players
Serie C players
Palermo F.C. players
U.S. Sassuolo Calcio players
Calcio Foggia 1920 players
Latina Calcio 1932 players
Fulham F.C. players
A.C. Cesena players
Hellas Verona F.C. players
Empoli F.C. players
S.S.C. Bari players
A.C. Reggiana 1919 players
Reggina 1914 players
A.S. Cittadella players
F.C. Pro Vercelli 1892 players
Italian people of Sardinian descent
Tunisian people of Sardinian descent
Tunisian people of Italian descent